Amarillo, Texas is a city in the US. 

Amarillo, yellow or golden in Spanish, may also refer to:

People 
 Amarillo Slim (1928–2012), American poker player
 Eric Amarillo (born 1971), Swedish singer

Music

Record labels
 Amarillo Records, a record label

Songs
 "(Is This the Way to) Amarillo", a 1971 song written and released by Neil Sedaka as "Amarillo"
 "Amarillo", a 1976 song co-written and performed by Emmylou Harris
 "Amarillo", a 1999 song from the album Escorpión de Primavera by Anasol
 "Amarillo" (Gorillaz song), a 2011 song by Gorillaz
 "Amarillo", a 2017 song from El Dorado by Shakira
 "Amarillo" (J Balvin song), a 2020 song from Colores by J Balvin

Other uses 
 Amaryllis, a plant commonly referred to as amarillo
 "Amarillo" (Better Call Saul), an episode of Better Call Saul

See also
 Amaryllis (disambiguation)